Dunsford is a village in Devon, England, just inside the Dartmoor National Park.

The place-name 'Dunsford' is first attested in the Domesday Book of 1086, where it appears as Dunesforda, meaning 'Dunn's ford'.

The village has a number of traditional thatched cottages; a primary school which has a swimming pool, climbing wall and sports field; one village shop and post office; a tea room and a public house. St Mary's Church, built between 1420 and 1455, is located in the village centre.

Dunsford holds a village show at the beginning of July every year and the Dunsford Amateur Dramatic Society (DADS) produces a pantomime in the Village Hall in early January. The villagers also hold an annual fancy dress pancake race in the streets.

Dunsford Halt was a station on the Teign Valley Line from Exeter to Heathfield station that served the village from 1928 to 1958.

Great Fulford House lies to the west of Dunsford; a Domesday manor which has been the home of the Fulford family since at least 1190. The present house was mainly built in the early 16th century and is a semi-fortified mansion house built round a central courtyard. It was the backdrop to the 2014 reality-television programme, Life Is Toff.

Nearby is Dunsford Woods nature reserve which is managed by Devon Wildlife Trust and consists of 57 hectares of river valley woodland, heath-covered rocky slopes and fertile flood-plain scrub and grassland. It is especially known for its wild daffodils and six species of fritillary butterfly.

The hamlet of Butts is about one mile west of Dunsford, and generally considered to be part of the village, as is "Reedy," a similar distance to the East.

References

External links

Dunsford Show official website
Dunsford Village website

Villages in Devon